Kľúčovec is a village and municipality in the Dunajská Streda District in the Trnava Region of south-west Slovakia.

Geography
The municipality lies at an altitude of 110 metres and covers an area of 12.708 km2.

History
In the 9th century, the territory of Kľúčovec became part of the Kingdom of Hungary. In historical records the village was first mentioned in 1252 as "Kwichud" when King Béla IV of Hungary donated the village to the provostship of Túróc (now: Turiec). Until the end of World War I, the village was part of Hungary and fell within the Tószigetcsilizköz district of Győr County. After the Austro-Hungarian army disintegrated in November 1918, Czechoslovakian troops occupied the area. After the Treaty of Trianon of 1920, the village became officially part of Czechoslovakia. In November 1938, the First Vienna Award granted the area to Hungary and it was held by Hungary until 1945. After Soviet occupation in 1945, Czechoslovakian administration returned and the village became officially part of Czechoslovakia in 1947.

Demography 
At the 2001 Census the recorded population of the village was 372 while an end-2008 estimate by the Statistical Office had the villages's population as 373. As of 2001, 98.12% of its population were Hungarians and 1.34% were Slovaks. Calvinism is the majority religion of the village, while the second largest denomination is the Roman Catholic Church.

See also
 List of municipalities and towns in Slovakia

References

Genealogical resources

The records for genealogical research are available at the state archive "Statny Archiv in Bratislava, Slovakia"
 Roman Catholic church records (births/marriages/deaths): 1731-1898 (parish B)
 Reformated church records (births/marriages/deaths): 1791-1896 (parish A)

External links
News related to the village 
 :sk:Kľúčovec Informácie v slovenčine
Surnames of living people in Klucovec

Villages and municipalities in Dunajská Streda District
Hungarian communities in Slovakia